Christopolis or Christoupolis ("city of Christ") can refer to the following places and jurisdictions:

 Cristópolis, a municipality in the state of Bahia in Brazil
 Kavala, in Macedonia Secunda (now mainland Greece), known in Byzantine times as Christoupolis
 Birgi, now in Asian Turkey, known as Christoupolis in the 7th–12th centuries
 Monrovia, known as Christopolis in 1822–24, now capital of the West Africa nation of Liberia